KKRS (97.3 FM) is a radio station broadcasting a Christian radio format. Licensed to Davenport, Washington, United States, the station serves the Spokane area. The station is currently owned by Penfold Communications.

References

External links
KKRS's website

KRS
Radio stations established in 1998